Guo Xinwa (Guō Xīnwá) is a Chinese badminton player. Guo won 2018 Asian Junior Championships in the mixed doubles with partner Liu Xuanxuan. In his early career, he joined the Jinzhou Sports School badminton team for training at the age of 8, and afterwards joined the Shandong team at the age of 13. When he turned 17, he represented the Shandong team in the National Games and won 2–1 against Beijing team. His upset victory over Lin Dan made him famous in the first battle.

Achievements

Asian Junior Championships 
Mixed doubles

BWF World Tour 
The BWF World Tour, which was announced on 19 March 2017 and implemented in 2018, is a series of elite badminton tournaments sanctioned by the Badminton World Federation (BWF). The BWF World Tour is divided into levels of World Tour Finals, Super 1000, Super 750, Super 500, Super 300 (part of the HSBC World Tour), and the BWF Tour Super 100.

Mixed doubles

BWF International 
Men's doubles

Mixed doubles

  BWF International Challenge tournament
  BWF International Series tournament

BWF Junior International 
Men's doubles

Mixed doubles

  BWF Junior International Grand Prix tournament
  BWF Junior International Challenge tournament
  BWF Junior International Series tournament
  BWF Junior Future Series tournament

References 

2000 births
Living people
People from Jinzhou
Badminton players from Liaoning
Chinese male badminton players